The Five Mountains of Northern Shinshu or Five Mountains of Northern Nagano Prefecture are the traditionally distinctive mountains that can be seen in the northern Nagano Prefecture. They are: Mt. lizuna (飯縄山, 1917 meters above sea level), Mt. Togakushi (戸隠山, 1904 m), Mt. Kurohime (黒姫山, 2053 m), Mt. Madarao (斑尾山, 1381 m) and Mt. Myoko (妙高山, 2454 m). 

They are all located in Nagano Prefecture, except Mt. Myoko which is in Niigata Prefecture. They are also recently (in 2015) included in Myōkō-Togakushi Renzan National Park, except Mt. Madarao.

Where to see these mountains
The Five Mountains of Northern Shinshu can be seen standing in a row from the southern part of Nakano City, Nagano Prefecture. They can also be observed in a row from the hot spring in Obuse Town.

See also   
Tourism in Nagano Prefecture
Myōkō-Togakushi Renzan National Park

References

External link
Myōkō-Togakushi Renzan National Park

Nagano Prefecture
Tourist attractions in Nagano Prefecture